588 rue paradis is a 1992 semi-autobiographical film written and directed by French-Armenian filmmaker Henri Verneuil. The film's principal cast includes Richard Berry, Claudia Cardinale and Omar Sharif. It was preceded by Mayrig, the first autobiographical movie of Henri Verneuil.

Cast
 Richard Berry	... Pierre Zakar (Azad Zakarian)
 Omar Sharif ... 	Hagop, Pierre's father
 Claudia Cardinale	... Araxi (Mayrig) - Pierre's mother
 Nathalie Roussel  ... Gayane, Pierre's aunt
 Zabou Breitman    ...  Astrid Sétian
 	... Carole
 Jacques Villeret	... Alexandre
 Danièle Lebrun	... 	Alexandre's mother
 Sylvie Joly	... 	Georgette Sylva
 Ginette Garcin
 Jacky Nercessian

References
588 rue paradis

External links

French drama films
1992 films
1990s French-language films
Films directed by Henri Verneuil
Armenian genocide films
1990s French films